The 1968–69 season was Port Vale's 57th season of football in the English Football League, and their fourth successive season (fifth overall) in the Fourth Division. New manager Gordon Lee used the season to consolidate the club after it was readmitted to the Football League immediately after being expelled for illegal payment of players. Managing 46 goals scored and conceded, and 46 points gained in 46 games, he had built a solid base for future progress. However the club's financial problems continued, as another loss was made to increase the club's debt levels.

Overview

Fourth Division
On 8 June, the club's future was decided, as a vote of 39 to 9 allowed the club readmission to the Football League, despite the conclusion of an investigation earlier in the year which ruled that the club should be expelled from the League. New manager Gordon Lee thus began work on rebuilding his squad, announcing a team approach with an additional 'individual coaching plan' for players to improve their personal weaknesses. Lee was big on coaching, and replaced cross country running exercises with realistic match-day situations. Stanley Matthews would become more of a scout and would only visit Burslem on a weekly basis, he also agreed to allow the £9,000 owed to him in payments delayed until the club were on a sounder financial footing. His name removed from his office door, he 'gradually drifted out of the picture'. Three signings of note included: 'tenacious' wing-half John King (Tranmere Rovers); Wales international winger Graham Williams (Tranmere Rovers); and teenager Bobby Gough (Walsall).

The season opened with four Roy Chapman goals in four games, though only three points were won in the first six encounters. With Sharratt out injured, in came 'part-time, pipe-smoking civil servant' Geoff Hickson on loan from Crewe Alexandra. Lee quickly earned the respect of the Vale fans despite his team lying bottom of the table in mid-September. A new club mascot was unveiled at this time – 'Prince Val'. Some good home performances lifted the club off the bottom of the table, including a 4–1 thumping of Scunthorpe United and a stylish back-heeled goal from Roy Sproson in a 1–1 draw with Lincoln City. Chapman then developed sciatica and had to be rested until December. An excellent defence helped the club then to achieve a five-game unbeaten run in the league. In November, goalkeeper Keith Ball was signed from Walsall for 'a small fee' and Graham Newton joined on trial after leaving the Atlanta Chiefs. On Boxing day, Vale travelled to Sincil Bank, where they beat second-placed Lincoln 1–0 in front of 12,208 spectators. Soon after Bill Asprey retired as a player to coach at Sheffield Wednesday.

A 5–0 mauling of Newport County on 18 January sent the Vale into the top half of the table, though just one goal was scored and one point gained in the next four games. In March, Lee adopted a more 'hit and run' style, and saw his team achieve three straight wins. On the 29th, with the club seeming safe from re-election, 'hooliganism reared its ugly head' as Chester found their team bus smashed with bricks following a 2–1 loss at Burslem. On 21 April, Sproson made his 700th league appearance in a 1–0 win over struggling Grimsby Town. The final day was a 1–1 draw with wooden-spoon club Bradford Park Avenue, though the Vale had five goals disallowed. Nevertheless, this game was the first of a club-record nineteen league game streak without a loss that would end on 22 November 1969 the following season.

They finished in thirteenth place with 46 points from their 46 games, scoring 46 and conceding 46 goals.

Finances
On the financial side, a £10,900 loss was made despite donations of £16,734 from the Sportsmen's Association and the Development Fund. This left the club's total debts standing at £178,277. The club needed an average home attendance of 6,000 to break even, and were almost two thousand short of this total. More stringent economies were thus imposed upon the club. Five professionals left on free transfers: Mick Cullerton (Chester); Mick Mahon (York City); Jimmy Goodfellow (Workington); Graham Williams (Runcorn); and Milija Aleksic (Eastwood). Lee claimed 'it was a hard decision, but I have had to create room for improvement'. Roy Chapman was offered a new contract, but opted instead to sign with Chester.

Cup competitions
In the FA Cup, with Sharrat injured and Hickson re-called by Crewe, seventeen-year-old Milija Aleksic was roped in to play in the First Round clash with Third Division Shrewsbury Town. He also played in the replay following the 1–1 draw, and the club progressed with a 3–1 win over their 'lacklustre' opponents. The "Valiants" also required a replay to progress past Workington. Vale then exited at the Third Round with a 1–0 defeat at Vicarage Road to Watford.

In the League Cup, defeat came in the First Round to Wrexham at the Racecourse Ground. Stuart Sharratt cracked a kneecap in the game and later contracted a virus in his blood, which kept him out of action for the rest of the season.

League table

Results
Port Vale's score comes first

Football League Fourth Division

Results by matchday

Matches

FA Cup

League Cup

Player statistics

Appearances

Top scorers

Transfers

Transfers in

Transfers out

Loans in

Loans out

References
Specific

General

Port Vale F.C. seasons
Port Vale